Two Cheap Husbands (Spanish:Dos maridos baratos) is a 1960 Mexican comedy western film directed by Jaime Salvador and starring Lilia Prado, Demetrio González and Julio Aldama.

Cast
 Lilia Prado
 Demetrio González 
 Julio Aldama 
 Leonor Llausás 
 Fernando Soto 
 Joaquín García Vargas 
 José Jasso 
 Consuelo Frank 
 Roberto Meyer 
 Armando Arriola 
 Arturo Castro 'Bigotón' 
 Roberto Soto hijo
 Don Carlos y Neto

References

Bibliography 
 Emilio García Riera. Historia documental del cine mexicano: 1959-1960. Universidad de Guadalajara, 1994.

External links 
 

1960 films
1960s Western (genre) comedy films
Mexican Western (genre) comedy films
1960s Spanish-language films
Films directed by Jaime Salvador
1960 comedy films
1960s Mexican films